Hemoglycin (previously termed hemolithin) is a space polymer that is the first polymer of amino acids found in meteorites.

Structure 
Structural work has determined that its 1494 Dalton core unit (Glycine18 / Hydroxy-glycine4 / Fe2O4) contains iron, but not lithium, leading to the more general term hemoglycin for these molecules  The hemoglycin core contains a total of 22 glycine residues in an anti-parallel beta sheet chain that is terminated at each end by an iron atom plus two oxygens. Four of these glycine residues are oxidized to hydroxy-glycine with hydroxy groups (-OH) on the alpha carbon. This structure was determined by mass spectrometry of meteoritic solvent extracts and has been confirmed in X-ray scattering by crystals of hemoglycin, and also by optical absorption. Crystals show a 480 nm characteristic absorption that can only exist when hydroxy-glycine residues have “R” chirality and are C-terminal bonded to Fe.

History 
Because hemoglycin has now been found to be the dominant polymer of amino acids in 6 different meteorites (Allende, Acfer 086, Efremovka, Kaba, Orgueil and Sutter’s Mill), each time with the same structure, it has been proposed that it is produced by a process of template replication. The measured 480 nm absorbance is larger than expected for a racemic distribution of R and S chirality in the hydroxy-glycine residues, indicating an R chirality excess in the polymer. Modeling of template replication that is assumed to depend on 480 nm absorption leads to an excess of R chirality and thus is consistent with this finding.

Significance 
Hemoglycin is a completely abiotic molecule that forms in molecular clouds going on to protoplanetary disks, way before biochemistry on exoplanets like Earth begins. Hemoglycin via its glycine could seed an exoplanet (one able to support early biochemistry) but its main function appears to be the accretion of matter via formation of an extensive low-density lattice in space in a protoplanetary disk. Besides being present in carbonaceous meteorites, hemoglycin has also been extracted and crystalized from a fossil stromatolite that formed on Earth 2.1 billion years ago. Potentially this fossil hemoglycin was delivered during the Late Heavy Bombardment (LHB) to Earth. Data to support this being the hemoglycin in the fossil has extra-terrestrial isotopes similar to that in meteorites. 

The polymer on the precambrian Earth could have functioned to drive the Great Oxygenation Event (GOE) beginning 2.4 Gya by splitting water in response to ultraviolet irradiation. Also, it could provide an energy source to early biochemistry and/or it simply delivered a source of polymer glycine.

See also

 Ancient protein
 Bubble (physics)
 Earliest known life forms
 Evolutionary history of life
 Extraterrestrial: The First Sign of Intelligent Life Beyond Earth
 List of interstellar and circumstellar molecules
 Panspermia
 Protein

References

Astrobiology
Biological hypotheses
Iron compounds
Origin of life
Panspermia
Prebiotic chemistry
Proteins